Arion flagellus, also known by its common name (in the United Kingdom) the "Durham slug", is a species of air-breathing land slug, a terrestrial pulmonate gastropod mollusc in the family Arionidae, the roundback slugs.

Distribution
This species is endemic to the Iberian peninsula, but has been introduced in various countries and islands including:
 Great Britain
 Ireland
 and other areas

References

External links 
 Arion flagellus at Animalbase taxonomy,short description, distribution, biology,status (threats), images 
 Arion flagellus at Encyclopedia of Life
 Info focusing on Ireland: 

Arion (gastropod)
Gastropods described in 1893
Taxa named by Walter Collinge